Gaosha may refer to the following locations in China:

 Gaosha Road Station, Hangzhou Metro Line 1
 Gaosha, Fujian, town in Sha County
 Gaosha, Dongkou, town in Dongkou County